Magicians Holiday is the debut album by The Gap Band in 1974 on Shelter Records.

Track listing

Personnel
The Gap Band
 Charles Wilson – lead vocals, backing vocals, piano, Clavinet, organ
 Ronnie Wilson – backing vocals, trumpet
 Robert Wilson – backing vocals, bass
 Roscoe Smith – drums
 O'Dell Stokes – guitar
 Tommy Lokey – trumpet
 Alvin Jones – trombone
 Chris Clayton – saxophone
 Carl Scoggins – congas, percussions
with:
 Jamie Oldaker – drums on "Easy Life"
Wayne Perkins - guitar on "Bad Girl" and "Loving You Is Everything"
Tuck Andress - guitar on "Tommy's Groove"
Technical
Kirk Bressler - engineer
Malcolm Cecil, Robert Margouleff - remixing engineer
Tom Wilkes - album design, front cover photography

Samples
 "Tommy's Groove"
 "Ragtime"" by Brand Nubian on their One For All album.

References

External links
Magicians Holiday at Discogs

1974 debut albums
The Gap Band albums
Shelter Records albums